Crypsitricha generosa is a species of moth in the family Tineidae. It was described by Alfred Philpott in 1926. This species is endemic to New Zealand.

References

Moths described in 1926
Tineidae
Moths of New Zealand
Endemic fauna of New Zealand
Endemic moths of New Zealand